Amblychilepas javanicensis, common name the rayed keyhole limpet, is a species of sea snail, a marine gastropod mollusk in the family Fissurellidae, the keyhole limpets.

Description
The size of the shell varies between 20 mm and 31 mm.

Distribution
This marine species occurs off Southern Queensland, Western Australia and off Tasmania, living in sand in open but sheltered waters in the subtidal zone from low water to depths of about 20 m.

References

External links
 

Fissurellidae
Gastropods described in 1822